Donnersbachwald is a former municipality in the district of Liezen in Styria, Austria. Since the 2015 Styria municipal structural reform, it is part of the municipality Irdning-Donnersbachtal.

References

Rottenmann and Wölz Tauern
Cities and towns in Liezen District